Cooper, New Jersey may refer to:

 Cooper, Gloucester County, New Jersey, U.S.
 Cooper, Passaic County, New Jersey, U.S.

See also
 Cooper River (New Jersey), a tributary of the Delaware River, New Jersey, U.S.